Vincent Massey Collegiate Institute (Vincent Massey, VMCI, or Massey) is a Toronto District School Board facility that was previously operated as public secondary school in Toronto, Ontario, Canada. It was operated by the Etobicoke Board of Education in the former suburb of Etobicoke from its opening in 1961 until its closure in 1985 and later became the Vincent Massey Centre as an adult school until 1993. Owned and oversighted by the board's arms-length division, Toronto Lands Corporation, it is one of two schools in Etobicoke to be named for the late Governor General of Canada, the other was Vincent Massey Public School (which also closed in the 1980s).

History
On May 10, 1960, the Etobicoke Board of Education agreed to construct Vincent Massey Collegiate Institute at a cost of $1,120,000 with 14 standard classrooms, 1 art, 1 music, 2 science labs, 1 library, 1 home economics, 1 shop, 1 typing room, double gym and cafeteria. After hefty construction work, the school opened its doors in September 1961. The school was designed in modern architectural style by architectural firm D. Ross King.

The school had erected its first addition in 1963, next is the second addition in 1966 with the new western classroom wings and the auditorium, then the third addition being the library in 1970, and concluded with the fourth and final addition containing extra classrooms, single gymnasium, and technical shops built in 1975.

During its existence, it produced two Reach for the Top National Championship teams in 1966 and 1978, and was the only high school in Canada to accomplish this during the original 20 year Canadian Broadcasting Corporation production of the show.

After its closure in 1985 due to low enrollment, the building served for several years as an adult education centre and later moved to Burnhamthorpe Collegiate Institute in September 1987.

Later, the building was used as a temporary campus of Dufferin-Peel Separate School Board's Philip Pocock Catholic Secondary School in Mississauga, Ontario while the Pocock primary campus was under renovation. Since then, most of its students were rehoused at Silverthorn Collegiate Institute. The Pocock school began leasing the Massey site in September 1987. Massey served as the Pocock Etobicoke campus, serving 1,200 students in grades 11–13. The school's 9th- and 10th-grade students remained at the original Pocock. Originally the school planned to lease the Massey campus for at least five years. In May 1988 the Dufferin-Peel separate board announced that it would give Massey to the Ontario government in exchange for an addition funded by the provincial government built at the original Pocock and at least $10 million. The Mississauga News described the relationship as a "strong tie to Mississauga."

With the funding of Ontario's Catholic high schools since 1984, the Vincent Massey CI site was turned over to the Metropolitan Separate School Board (now today, Toronto Catholic District School Board) on July 1, 1990, effectively leasing the Massey campus. Etobicoke's first Catholic high school, Michael Power-St. Joseph High School, moved in September 1993 from the Bloor-Dundas complex to the campus since its inception in 1949 and 1957 (merged 1982). The MSSB originally offered the site of the former Mimico High School (now John English Junior Middle School) to relocate its student body there, but the MSSB rejected the transfer due to an outcry of protest (Power received its campus outlet in September 1985 at the former Alderwood site, and becoming Father John Redmond in 1986.)

A reunion for those who attended the campus from 1962 to 1985 was held in 2009. It was the first full reunion for the student body in 20 years.

See also

List of high schools in Ontario
Michael Power-St. Joseph High School

References

External links
 Vincent Massey Collegiate Institute Reunion
 VMCI on Facebook

Schools in the TDSB
Educational institutions established in 1961
High schools in Toronto
Educational institutions disestablished in 1985
1961 establishments in Ontario
Toronto Lands Corporation